Bcycle, b-cycle, or variation, may refer to:

 BCycle, public bikeshare subsidiary of Trek Bicycle, based in Waterloo, Wisconsin, USA; with bike programs spread across the U.S.
 San Antonio B-Cycle, public bikeshare program in San Antonio, Texas, USA
 Houston Bcycle, public bikeshare program operated by Houston Bike Share, in Houston, Texas, USA
 Bicycle, a human-powered, two-wheeled vehicle, with front and aft wheels

See also

 B (disambiguation)
 Cycle (disambiguation)
 Bicycle (disambiguation)
 Bicyclic